Diario Popular is a newspaper published in Paraguay.

Founded on December 19, 1994, in Asunción. It is part of Grupo Multimedia SA, which includes the digital newspaper Hoy, and the radio stations Popular y Corazón.

References

Newspapers published in Paraguay